Stickman, stick man, stickmen or stick men may refer to:

Arts and entertainment
 Stick figure, a simple line drawing that represents a human being
 Stickmen (film), a 2001 New Zealand film directed by Hamish Rothwell
 Stick Man, a children's book written by Julia Donaldson and illustrated by Axel Scheffler
 Stick Men (punk band), an early 1980s new wave band from Philadelphia
 Stick Men (prog band), a progressive rock band formed in 2007 by members of King Crimson

Other uses
 Stickman Graphics, a Brooklyn-based publisher of graphic novels and how-to books
 Eberlein Drive, known as The Stickmen in 2017, an American basketball team
 Based Stickman, a nom-de-guerre of felon white supremacist activist Kyle Chapman